Titoki may refer to:
 Alectryon excelsus, a native tree of New Zealand found in lowland forests
 Titoki, New Zealand, a town in the Northland region of New Zealand